Elizabeth Donald (1858–1940) was a British/New Zealand painter.

References 

British women painters
19th-century New Zealand painters
20th-century New Zealand painters
20th-century New Zealand male artists
1858 births
1940 deaths
20th-century British women artists
19th-century British women artists